Brewing beer in Thailand began in 1933 with the granting of a brewing license to 57-year-old Phraya Bhirom Bhakdi, born
Boon Rawd Sreshthaputra. His company, Boon Rawd Brewery, produces Thailand's oldest and best-known lager, Singha (pronounced "sing"). Singha is sold in Thailand in standard (5 percent ABV), light (4.5 percent ABV), and draught versions.

Singha's largest competitor is Chang beer, made by Thai Beverages and well known worldwide to compete with Leo for taste and popularity. Chang is noted globally for its sponsorship of Everton's football club, as its name and logo appeared on the team uniform from 2004 to 2017.

The Thai Asia Pacific Brewery (TAPB) at its Nonthaburi plant brews Heineken (since 1995), Tiger, Cheers, and Cheers X-Tra (6.5 percent ABV). It is the Thailand importer of Guinness and Kilkenny.

Boon Rawd Brewery also makes Leo, a standard lager. In addition, Thai Beverages sells Archa, a mass-market, non-premium lager which doesn't sell well. Boon Rawd Brewery also sold a global brand called Mittweida, but this was replaced by a beer brewed in partnership with InBev, Kloster. It also sells a 6.5 percent lager called Thai Beer.

Other locally brewed Thai beers are Phuket Beer and Siam, both in Pathum Thani Province. Siam Beer exports Bangkok Beer abroad, but does not sell it in Thailand. Phuket Beer and Federbräu are the only Thai beers brewed in accordance with the German purification law, the Reinheitsgebot. Phuket Lager received the first gold medal ever for a beer from Thailand at the 2006 Monde Selection Awards.

Klassik beer is another local beer brewed in Pathum Thani Province.

Foreign beers are not very popular in Thailand, mainly because the government protects its domestic breweries by the imposition of import duties up to 60 percent. In addition, all imported beer must bear an import sticker on the bottle cap. As a result, Thai brewers have entered into partnerships with Western brewers, such as Carlsberg's former partnership with Thai Beverages (since abrogated), or Asahi's partnership with Boon Rawd.

Economics
In the past, the economics of beer market in Thailand were stable but last year it grew due to innovation amongst Thai beer companies such as Singha, Chang, and others in an attempt to attract new customers.

Even though mainstream beer in Thailand is more than 80% and costs is 1.8 hundred thousand million. Nowadays, super premium beer is less than 1% but it will rise up quickly because new generation of consumers likes to try and taste something new, so that according with trend of the beer market in worldwide.

Thailand has two big companies: Boon Rawd Brewery and Thai Beverages, with the following turnovers.

Thai Beverages:
 2012 – Income : 34,386 million baht loss : 1,256 million baht
 2013 – Income : 32,935 million baht loss : 447 million baht
 2014 – Income : 35,193 million baht profit : 396 million baht
 2015 – Income : 43,112 million baht profit : 1,215 million baht
 2016 – Income : 44,397 million baht profit : 2,780 million baht

Boon Rawd Brewery:
 2012 – Income : 98,990 million baht profit : 3,115 million baht
 2013 – Income : 105,563 million baht profit : 3,256 million baht
 2014 – Income : 113,897 million baht profit : 2,915 million baht
 2015 – Income : 116,548 million baht profit : 2,310 million baht
 2016 – Income : 104,794 million baht profit : 770 million baht

In 2018, the proportions were Leo 53%, Chang 38%, and Singha 5%.

All the above reasons make us know why economics of beer market in Thailand are growing. Even super premium beer group is rising up but cost will be increasing again because it will bring 2% to elderly fund followed by new law.

Craft beer

Two types of licenses are available in Thailand for would-be beer producers. Thailand's 1950 Liquor Act states that beer can only be made in a factory making more than 1,000,000 litres per year or in a brewpub producing at least 100,000 litres per year for sale on-site with no bottling permitted. Brewpub beers cannot be sold off-premises. The finance ministry in 2000 ruled that, for either type of producer to be legal, they must be a limited company with capital of at least 10 million baht. The maximum penalty for "home brewing" under the 1950 Liquor Act used to be 200 baht for making it and 5,000 baht for selling it. A new law passed by the National Legislative Assembly in December 2016 raised the maximum penalty for illegal production to 100,000 baht or a prison sentence of six months, or both. The maximum fine for selling illegal beer was raised to 50,000 baht. To sell craft beers off-premises, one small brewer explained, "We have two choices: Either hire an overseas factory to make it or build a factory abroad on our own,..." and import it.

Meanwhile, military-controlled ASEAN neighbour Myanmar, in January 2017, got its first craft beer microbrewery, "Burbrit". Its name is derived from "Burma" and "Britain", in recognition of British influence on Burma's brewing history.

Thai industrial breweries

 Asia Pacific Breweries
 Boon Rawd Brewery
 Carlsberg
 Heineken
 Phuket Beer (San Miguel Brewery in Thailand, under supervision of Tropical Beverage Company.)
 San Miguel Brewery
 ThaiBev

Gallery

See also
 Beer and breweries by region

References

External links
 
 Beer jaa

 
Thai alcoholic drinks